The Heritage Orchestra is a British orchestra founded by Chris Wheeler and Jules Buckley. They perform mainstream, cult, experimental and popular music.  The orchestra, which ranges between 25 and 65 members, has performed internationally in venues such as the Sydney Opera House, Emirates Palace, and Hollywood Bowl, and tours throughout the UK to major concert halls and large-scale arenas, including The O2 Arena in London.

In 2010, The Heritage Orchestra was nominated in the 9th Independent Music Awards and won the Contemporary Classical Album award for their performance of Gabriel Prokofiev's 'Concerto for Turntables and Orchestra' along with DJ Yoda. In 2017 the orchestra reached Number One in the UK Album Charts with BBC Radio 1 DJ Pete Tong and their album Classic House. The orchestra performs regularly at the BBC Proms.

Directors
Heritage Orchestra was founded in June 2004 by Artistic Director/Producer Christopher Wheeler and Conductor/Composer Jules Buckley. Wheeler was profiled in 2011 as one of the "cultural engineers" of Honda's Dream Factory. Jules Buckley is chief conductor of the Metropole Orkest in the Netherlands winning a Grammy Award for Best Contemporary Instrumental Album with Snarky Puppy on their album Sylva. Wheeler and Buckley have worked together since meeting in 2001 at the Guildhall School of Music & Drama, London.

Past live performances and collaborations 

Past live performances and collaborations by the Heritage Orchestra include:
Montreux Jazz Festival appearance for an evening organised by Gilles Peterson in July 2005.
Deodato at Hackney Empire on 21 July 2006
DJ Yoda at Scala, London on 26 July 2007 performing the world premier of Gabriel Prokofiev's Concerto for Turntables, also including a performance with Plaid of Warp Records
The Bays & The Heritage Orchestra – UK Tour – funded by Arts Council England via Music Beyond The Mainstream with subsequent shows at the Tower of London (Sept 2009) and Womad Festival 2010
Vangelis’s Blade Runner soundtrack played live for the first time ever, created for Massive Attack’s Meltdown Festival at the Royal Festival Hall on 17 June 2008 and the Sydney Opera House on 26 May 2013 at Vivid Live
Bill Drummond of The KLF – recording and deleting The17 on 13 October 2008
Spiritualized performing Ladies & Gentlemen We Are Floating in Space at the Royal Festival Hall London on 13 October 2009 and on 9 May 2010 at the festival All Tomorrows Parties
John Cale performing Paris 1919 at the Royal Festival Hall on 5 March 2010 and the Theatre Royal, Norwich in May 2010
Jamie Cullum at the BBC Proms in the Royal Albert Hall London on 26 August 2010, and also 11 August 2016
Tim Minchin UK Tour (cont.) in 2011, including; Edinburgh Playhouse (16 & 17 April); Clyde Auditorium, Glasgow (18 April), Aberdeen Exhibition Hall (19 April), Royal Albert Hall, London (28 & 29 April), Clyde Auditorium, Glasgow (8 May), Sheffield Arena (10 May); Liverpool Arena(11 May). Also appearing on his live DVD and CD 'Tim Minchin and the Heritage Orchestra', released November 2011
The Leisure Society at the Barbican London on 8 December 2011
Bryce Dessner & Aaron Dessner performing The Long Count at the Barbican, London, on 2, 3 and 4 February 2012
SBTRKT on BBC Live Lounge, Maida Vale Studios, on 12 March 2012
'Live_Transmission: Joy Division Reworked' with Scanner and visual artist Matt Watkins premiered at the Brighton Festival on 18 May 2012, later performed at the Sydney Opera House on 29 May 2013, then throughout the UK in Sept/Oct 2013 including the Royal Festival Hall, London; Nottingham Royal Concert Hall, Royal & Derngate, Northampton; Colston Hall, Bristol; Cambridge Corn Exchange; The Anvil, Basingstoke; Symphony Hall, Birmingham; The Lowry, Salford; Philharmonic Hall, Liverpool; Usher Hall, Edinburgh; Sage Gateshead.
Aphex Twin and The Remote Orchestra at the Barbican Hall on 10 October 2012
Sydney Opera House performance of 'Live_Transmission: Joy Division Reworked' with Scanner and visual artist Matt Watkins
The Light Surgeons performing SuperEverything UK Tour
The xx on BBC Radio 1 with Zane LoTim Exile]] (Warp Records) at Village Underground] performing live sampling orchestral electronica, entitled the Bardo EP as part of Will Dutta's event Blank Canvas on 5 September 2013
These New Puritans at the Barbican on 17 April 2014
BBC Radio 1 'Ibiza Prom' on 29 July 2015 as part of the BBC Proms season
Jamie Cullum at the BBC Proms in the Royal Albert Hall on 11 August 2016
Pete Tong & The Heritage Orchestra conducted by Jules Buckley perform Ibiza Classics, UK Arena Tour 2016 including: Arena Birmingham (30 November); The O2 Arena, London (1 December); Manchester Arena (2 December)

Discography
The Heritage Orchestra (Brownswood Recordings, 2006)
Arctic Monkeys – Leave Before The Lights Come On (Domino Records 2006)
Razorlight – Hostage of Love (Vertigo 2008)
Pete Lawrie – In The End EP (Island Records 2009)
The Heritage Orchestra Feat. DJ Yoda – G.Prokofiev Concerto for Turntables & Orchestra (Nonclassical 2009) – winner of 9th Independent Music Awards and won the Contemporary Classical Album category
Black Water Transit – Film Score (2009) directed by Tony Kaye
Unkle – Where Did The Night Fall (Surrender All 2010)
Emeli Sandé – Daddy (EMI 2011)
Jonathan Jeremiah – A Solitary Man (Island 2011)
Emeli Sandé - Clown (Virgin 2012)
Unkle and The Heritage Orchestra Presents 'Variation of a Theme' Live at the Union Chapel (Surrender All, 2014)
Sparks. Barbican December 19th and 20th 2014
Tim Minchin and the Heritage Orchestra (Laughing Stock Productions, 2015)
Pete Tong with the Heritage Orchestra conducted by Jules Buckley – Classic House (Polydor, Universal 2016) reaching No.1 in the UK Album Charts
Pete Tong with The Heritage Orchestra conducted by Jules Buckley – Ibiza Classics(Polydor, Universal 2017)

References

External links
 

British symphony orchestras
English orchestras
Independent Music Awards winners